AM 0644-741, also known as the Lindsay-Shapley Ring, is an unbarred lenticular galaxy, and a ring galaxy, which is 300 million light-years away in the southern constellation Volans.

Properties

Formation 
The yellowish nucleus was once the center of a normal spiral galaxy, and the ring which currently surrounds the center is 150,000 light years in diameter. The ring is theorized to have formed by a collision with another galaxy, which triggered a gravitational disruption that caused dust in the galaxy to condense and form stars, which forced it to then expand away from the galaxy and create a ring.

Physical characteristics 

The ring is a region of rampant star formation dominated by young, massive, hot blue stars. The pink regions along the ring are rarefied clouds of glowing hydrogen gas that is fluorescing as it is bombarded with strong ultraviolet light from the blue stars.

Future of the ring 
Galactic simulation models suggest that the ring of AM 0644-741 will continue to expand for about another 300 million years, after which it will begin to disintegrate.

References

Ring galaxies
Unbarred lenticular galaxies
Volans (constellation)
019481
34-11
06443-7411